The Pacific Seacraft 44 is a bluewater cruising yacht produced since 1990 by Pacific Seacraft of Washington, North Carolina. Although of GRP construction, the yacht is traditionally built with a cutter rig, skeg-hung rudder, canoe stern and semi-long keel. The yacht is a cruising design, with a high displacement and the characteristic 'canoe' stern of Bill Crealock.

See also
Pacific Seacraft 40

External links
Pacific Seacraft
The Pacific Seacraft 44

Sailing yachts
Boats designed by W. I. B. Crealock
1990s sailboat type designs
Sailboat types built by Pacific Seacraft